Sir David Bower Mitchell (20 June 1928 – 30 August 2014) was a British Conservative politician who was a Member of Parliament for over 30 years, and who served as a junior minister in Margaret Thatcher's government.

Early life
Mitchell was born in the Amersham Rural District in Buckinghamshire, and educated at Aldenham School, Hertfordshire, before becoming a wine shipper and merchant.

Political career
Mitchell served as a councillor on St Pancras Borough Council from 1956 to 1959. He contested St Pancras North in 1959. He was the Member of Parliament for Basingstoke from 1964 to 1983, and for Hampshire North West from 1983 until he retired in 1997. In 1970, he was appointed Parliamentary Private Secretary to Sir Keith Joseph, Secretary of State for Social Services in the Heath Ministry.

Mitchell served in the Thatcher Ministry as Parliamentary Under-Secretary of State for Industry, 1979–1981, Parliamentary Under-Secretary of State at the Northern Ireland Office, 1981–1983, and then Parliamentary Under-Secretary of State,  9 June 1983 – 9 January 1986, and Minister of State, 9 January 1986 – 25 July 1988, at the Department of Transport. He was knighted in 1988 upon his resignation from Government.

Mitchell's son Andrew Mitchell is the Member of Parliament for Sutton Coldfield, and served as Secretary of State for International Development and briefly as Chief Whip in David Cameron's government between 2010 and 2012.

Publications 
In 2008, Sir David Mitchell published an autobiography entitled "From House to House, The Endless Adventures of Politics & Wine" with The Memoir Club, .

References

1928 births
2014 deaths
People educated at Aldenham School
Conservative Party (UK) MPs for English constituencies
Knights Bachelor
Members of St Pancras Metropolitan Borough Council
UK MPs 1964–1966
UK MPs 1966–1970
UK MPs 1970–1974
UK MPs 1974
UK MPs 1974–1979
UK MPs 1979–1983
UK MPs 1983–1987
UK MPs 1987–1992
UK MPs 1992–1997
Northern Ireland Office junior ministers